The Zeller See (Standard German of Germany; Swiss Standard German: Zellersee; could be translated as "Lake of Radolfzell") is part of the Lower Lake, the lower part of Lake Constance. It lies in the bay of Radolfzell, and between the peninsula of Mettnau to the north and the peninsula of Höri to the south. To the west it is bounded by the ried of the Radolfzeller Aach.

The Zeller See has a maximum depth of 22 metres.

See also
Obersee (Lake Constance)
Gnadensee
Rheinsee

References

External links 

Geography of Lake Constance
Lakes of Baden-Württemberg